Palindanuwara Divisional Secretariat is a  Divisional Secretariat  of Kalutara District, of Western Province, Sri Lanka. Palindanuwara Divisional Secretarial Office is located in Baduraliya that is the major town in the area.  As of 2006, the total registered population in this division was 32,790, which included 8,247 households. The total registered vehicles in the region were 4,506 including 118 cars, 841 motorbikes and 3199 pedalcycles (push cycles).

References
 Divisional Secretariats Portal

Divisional Secretariats of Kalutara District